Pentaborane(11) is inorganic compound with the chemical formula B5H11.  It is an obscure boron hydride cluster, especially relative to the heavily studied pentaborane(9) (B5H9).  With two more hydrogen atoms than nido-pentaborane(9), pentaborane(11) is classified as an arachno- cluster.

Synthesis 
Like many boron hydride clusters, pentaborane(11) was originally obtained from the pyrolysis of diborane.  A more systematic synthesis entails treatment of [B4H9]− with boron tribromide.  The Lewis acid abstracts hydride to give unstable B4H8, the precursor to B5H11:
[B4H9]− +  BBr3   →   B4H8  +  HBBr3−
2 B4H8   →   B5H11  +  "B3H5"

References 

Boranes